Teaching of the Elders may refer to:

Sthaviravada
Theravada
Elder (Christianity)